Beinn a' Bhuidhe (IPA:[ˈpeiɲˈaˈvɯi.ə] (897 m) is a mountain in the Grampian Mountains of Scotland, west of the village of Dalmally in Argyll and Bute.

The mountain is the easternmost peak on the Ben Cruachan horseshoe, and is often climbed together with its neighbours, from which it is separated by with a steep northern flank.

References

Mountains and hills of Argyll and Bute
Marilyns of Scotland
Corbetts